Stage Fright is a 2005 double DVD (or single DVD + bonus CD) by the British rock and roll band Motörhead. It was filmed on 7 December 2004 in Düsseldorf, Germany to commemorate the band's 30th anniversary.

Track listing

DVD 1: The Concert

DVD 2: Features
Bonus DVD: L.A. Special
 Fans
 Making Of 'live show'
 Testimonials
 We Are The Road Crew
 Slide Show
 The Backstage Rider

We are the road crew
 Introduction
 Crew
 Sound
 Showtime
 The cook
 Touring

DVD ROM
 "Overkill" High Definition Track (DVD ROM)
 "Life’s a Bitch" - Realtone (DVD ROM)
 Motörhead Wallpapers (DVD ROM)
 L.A. Slideshow (DVD ROM)
 Discography (DVD ROM)

CD

Credits
 Lemmy - vocals, bass, harmonica on Whorehouse Blues
 Phil Campbell - guitar, backing vocals, acoustic guitar on Whorehouse Blues
 Mikkey Dee - drums, acoustic guitar on Whorehouse Blues

Motörhead video albums
Live video albums
2005 live albums
2005 video albums